Dream Come True is the second collaboration album by Filipino singer-actress Nora Aunor, with singer Tirso Cruz III released in 1971 by Vicor Music Corporation in LP format. The album contains duets of Aunor and De Leon. The Album contains 12 tracks including the song Moonlight Becomes You which is the winning song of Nora Aunor in the "Tawag ng Tanghalan" singing contest.

Background

Track listing

Side one

Side two

References

See also
 Nora Aunor Discography

Nora Aunor albums
1971 albums
Collaborative albums